Mahabad-e Jadid (also Romanized as Mahābād-e Jadīd; also known as Mahābād) is a village in Zozan Rural District, Jolgeh Zozan District, Khaf County, Razavi Khorasan Province, Iran. At the 2006 census, its population was 300, in 69 families.

References 

Populated places in Khaf County